William Gray Broaddus (born 1942), is an American politician and lawyer who served as attorney general of Virginia from 1985 to 1986. Having been Deputy Attorney General under Gerald Baliles, Broaddus became Attorney General on July 1, 1985 when Baliles resigned to campaign for the office of Governor of Virginia. Broaddus previously served as County Attorney of Henrico County, Virginia.

References

1942 births
Living people
Virginia Attorneys General